Cameron Ward (born May 25, 2002) is an American football quarterback for the Washington State Cougars. He previously played for the Incarnate Word Cardinals, where he won the Jerry Rice Award as the most outstanding freshman in the NCAA Division I Football Championship Subdivision.

Early life and high school career
Ward grew up in West Columbia, Texas and attended Columbia High School. He played in a Wing T offense at Columbia and as a junior completed 72 of 124 passes for 1,070 yards and seven touchdowns. As a senior, Ward averaged only 12 pass attempts per game. He was lightly recruited coming out of high school and committed to play at the University of the Incarnate Word, which was his only scholarship offer.

College career

Incarnate Word 
Ward began his collegiate career at Incarnate Word. He was named the Cardinals' starting quarterback going into his freshman season, which was played in the spring after being postponed due to COVID-19. He passed for 2,260 yards passing and FCS-leading 24 touchdowns against four interceptions with two rushing touchdowns in six games during the shortened 2020–21 FCS season  and won the Jerry Rice Award as the most outstanding freshman in the NCAA Division I Football Championship Subdivision. Ward passed for 4,648 yards and 47 touchdowns with 10 interceptions as a sophomore and was named the Southland Conference Offensive Player of the Year. After the end of the season Ward announced that he would be entering the NCAA transfer portal.

Washington State 
Ward announced his commitment to transfer to Washington State on January 10, 2022. He enrolled at the school for the second semester of his sophomore year and was named the starting quarterback for the 2022 season during the Cougars' spring practices.

Statistics

References

External links
Washington State Cougars bio
Incarnate Word Cardinals bio

2002 births
Living people
Players of American football from Texas
American football quarterbacks
Incarnate Word Cardinals football players
Washington State Cougars football players